Mae Avila D'Agostino (born December 18, 1954) is a United States district judge of the United States District Court for the Northern District of New York. She was formerly an attorney in Albany County, New York.

Early life, education and career 
D'Agostino was born on December 18, 1954, in Albany, New York.  D'Agostino received a Bachelor of Arts, magna cum laude, from Siena College in 1977 and a Juris Doctor from Syracuse University College of Law in 1980. D'Agostino practiced law in the Albany area, and was a partner in the firm of D'Agostino, Krackeler & Maguire, which focused on representing doctors, hospital and insurance companies in medical malpractice cases. From 1991 to 2011, she was an adjunct professor at Albany Law School.

Federal judicial service
On June 23, 2010, Senator Chuck Schumer recommended D'Agostino to fill a vacancy on the United States District Court for the Northern District of New York.  On September 29, 2010, President Barack Obama formally nominated her to the Northern District of New York. On March 28, 2011, the Senate confirmed her nomination by a vote of 88 ayes to 0 nays and she received her commission on March 30, 2011.

Personal
D'Agostino is a single mother of an adopted boy.

References

External links

1954 births
Living people
21st-century American judges
21st-century American women judges
American people of Italian descent
Judges of the United States District Court for the Northern District of New York
Lawyers from Albany, New York
Siena College alumni
Syracuse University College of Law alumni
United States district court judges appointed by Barack Obama